Xenophobia (Why?) is the third studio album by Australian rock band Spy vs. Spy, it was produced by Les Karski (Boys Next Door, Midnight Oil, Nauts) and Guy Gray, and released through WEA in March 1988. For this album Spy vs Spy were known as v. Spy v. Spy, and the line-up was the original trio Craig Bloxom on bass guitar/lead vocals, Cliff Grigg on drums/percussion and Mike Weiley on lead guitar/vocals.

After having toured for A.O. Mod. TV. Vers., WEA demanded another album immediately, so Xenophobia (Why?) was written and recorded in just six weeks, the title was inspired by race issues surfacing in the lead-up to Australia's Bicentennial year. The album peaked at No. 15 on the Kent Music Report and was released in 14 countries.

It provided three singles, "(Forget about the) Working Week", "Clarity of Mind" and "Waiting". None of the singles peaked in the Top 40 of the Kent Music Report for the Australian singles charts.

Reception
Smash Hits said, "The "why?" in the title is there so you won't think V.Spy V.Spy consider xenophobia a good idea. The rampant unsubtlety is the Spies through and through. They can't leave things alone. They have to keep ramming the point home. The production on the album is great. The cover is awful."

Track listing
All songs written by Craig Bloxom, Michael Weiley, Cliff Grigg and G Vasicek (aka Gary Morris).

Charts

Release history

References

1988 albums
Warner Music Australasia albums
Spy vs Spy (Australian band) albums